Liberty County is the name of four counties in the United States:

 Liberty County, Florida 
 Liberty County, Georgia 
 Liberty County, Montana 
 Liberty County, Texas

See also
 Liberty County High School (Florida)
 Liberty County High School (Georgia)